Kupk is a populated place located on the Tohono O'odham Indian Reservation in Pima County, Arizona, United States. Its name is derived from the Tohono O'odham ku:pik, meaning dam or dike.

References

Populated places in Pima County, Arizona